AxSTREAM is a software suite designed by SoftInWay Inc. for the conceptual
design of turbines and compressors and also thermodynamic calculations
of existing turbomachinery on-design and off-design operation. The
application area of the AxSTREAM software suite covers the design and
redesign of turbomachinery, and educational fields.

AxSTREAM is used for:
 Axial turbines
 Axial compressors
 Radial turbines
 Centrifugal compressors
 Axial fans
 Blowers
 Axial-flow pumps
Centrifugal Pumps
Turbopumps

While creating a new design, AxSTREAM allows the user to start from
initial inlet and outlet parameters, geometrical constraints, required
mass flow rate (capacity) and rotational speed to perform preliminary
design, 1D/2D calculation and optimization. Finally, it develops the
complete flow path geometry including meridional shapes, profiles, and
IGES model of each blade airfoil. As a multidisciplinary tool, AxSTREAM
uses a simplified 1D structural module to check the design in the early
phases during 1D/2D calculation and optimization. At the final stage of
design, AxSTREAM performs 3D structural and vibration analysis to check
the blade. It is also capable of producing a Campbell Diagram to show
harmful frequencies to the system.

AxSTREAM includes a CFD module to perform 3D calculation of flow in
interblade channels for both separate blade rows and the whole flow
path.

During the optimization of new or existing flow paths AxSTREAM enables the user:
 To change the geometry "manually" with the help of a user-friendly interface and further analysis in the 1D/2D solver and optimization using the existing infrastructure;
 To optimize the flow path using Design of Experiment methods (DoE).

While making thermodynamic calculations of the existing flow paths,
AxSTREAM provides off-design operation characteristics and allows
comparison with the experiment data.

One of AxSTREAM's features is high integration of all software
components which allows users to combine separate phases of design to
create a single processing chain. Having designed a flow path, AxSTREAM
can export the resulting geometry to CAD/CAE systems (e.g. UGS, Pro-E,
SolidWorks, Fluent, AutoCAD, ANSYS CFX, NUMECA etc.).

External links
 AxSTREAM for turbomachinery design
 Preliminary Design of LP Gas Turbine of Aircraft Engine from International Journal of Gas Turbine, Propulsion and Power Systems

Industrial design
Industrial computing